Bengali Hindus are the second largest Hindu community in Assam just after Assamese speaking Hindus. As per as estimation, around 6–7.5 million Bengali Hindus live in Assam as of 2011, majority of whom live in Barak Valley and a significant population resides in Assam's mainland Brahmaputra valley. Most Bengalis in Assamese dominated Brahmaputra valley are immigrants from neighbouring Bengal region and Tripura, while Bengalis in Barak Valley region of Assam are mostly native.

History 
The Barak Valley region of comprising the present districts of Cachar, Karimganj and Hailakandi is contiguous to Sylhet (Bengal plains), where the Bengali Hindus, according to historian J.B. Bhattacharjee, had settled well before the colonial period, influencing the culture of Dimasa Kacharis. Bhattacharjee argues that the Dimasa kings spoke Bengali and the inscriptions and coins written were in Sanskrit in Bengali script. Migrations to Cachar increased after the British annexation of the region. Bengalis in plains of Cachar valley were a significant, and sometimes dominant tribe/group/demographic for at least a period since the reign of Dhanya Manikya in the 15th century who hosted several Bengali Brahmin scholars in his court during his reign. Bengalis have been living in Barak Valley for at least 1,500 years, settling there much earlier than the Koches, Dimasas and the Tripuris. The Koches settled in Barak Valley in the 16th century, while the Dimasas settled in the late 16th - early 17th century A.D. While most Bengali Hindus have came into Assam's mainland Brahmaputra valley during the time of British Raj of 1826 (19th century) from neighbouring Bengal region as colonial official workers, bankers, railway employees, businessman,  bureaucrats and later on during the time Partition of Bengal in 1947 and before the Bangladesh liberation war of 1971 as refugees.

Demography

Population
Assam has a large Bengali Hindu population as per as estimation research, but
however different sources have varied estimation of Bengali Hindu population in Assam, as the census of India, does not allow religious segregation of languages spoken, it is very difficult to arrive at official estimates of a religious-linguistic matrix for the Assam state. It has been said that Bengali Hindus are the third largest community in Assam after Assamese Hindus and Bengali Muslims with a population of 6 million approx, constituting 19.3% of state population as of 2011 census estimation figure by Assam government.

Geographical concentration

They are highly concentrated in the Barak Valley region where they a form a slide majority and the population of Bengali Hindus in Barak Valley is 2,000,779 making up 55.2% of the total population of the region.

In Assam's Brahmaputra valley region, there is no real data for Bengali Hindu population available through census, but it is just assumed that region Brahmaputra valley have around "40 Lakh Bengali Hindus" as per as New president of the All Assam Bengali Youth Students Federation (AABYSF), Mahananda Sarkar Dutta who have stated the above demographic statement.

Social issues

Immigration

Since after partition of Bengal in 1947 there were large scale Bengali migration into Assam. Between the period of first patches (1946-1951), around 274,455 Bengali Hindu refugees have arrived from what is now called Bangladesh (former East Pakistan) in various locations of Assam as permanent settlers and again in second patches between (1952-1958) of the same decade, around 212,545 Bengali Hindus from Bangladesh took shelter in various parts of the state permanently. After the 1964 East Pakistan riots many Bengali Hindus have poured into Assam as refugees and the number of Hindu migrants in the state rose to 1,068,455 in 1968 (sharply after 4 years of the riot). The fourth patches numbering around 347,555 have just arrived after Bangladesh liberation war of 1971 as refugees and most of them being Bengali speaking Hindus have decided to stay back in Assam permanently afterwards.

Politics and discrimination 

Bangali Hindus are being targeted by xenophobic Assamese nationalist organization and political party from time to time. They are discriminatively tagged as Bongal (outsiders) in context of linguistic politics of Assam. Bengali Hindus living in Assam from decades before Bangladesh was born in 1971 are routinely called 'Bangladeshis' as because antipathy towards Bengalis is prime mover of Assam politics since the formalition of All Assam Students Union. Bengali Hindus are being victimized due to D voter policy in the state as according to Sudip Sarma, the publicity secretary of the Assam unit of the Nikhil Bharat Bangali Udbastu Samanway Samiti, there are 6 lakh Bengali Hindu D voters in the state. Thousands of Bengalis are being held in Detention Camps. As far as NRC is concerned in the state, 40 lakhs names have been kept out from the second draft of NRC, out of which 12 lakhs were Bengali Hindus. The CAA bill which was passed at 2019 December have promised to give citizenship to Bengali refugees living in the state living in Assam prior to 1971. In January 2019, the Assam's peasant organisation Krishak Mukti Sangram Samiti (KMSS) claimed that there are around 2 million Bangladeshi Hindus in Assam who would become Indian citizens if the Citizenship (Amendment) Bill is passed. BJP, however claimed that only eight lakh Hindu Bangladeshis will get citizenship. The number of Hindu immigrants from Bangladesh in Barak Valley has varied estimates. According to the Assam government, 1.3-1.5 lakh such people residing in the Barak Valley are eligible for citizenship if the Citizenship Amendment Act of 2019 becomes a law. During Bongal Kheda (chased out Bengali) movement Lakhs of Bengali Hindus were forcefully displaced from Assam and they subsequently immigrated to West Bengal, Barak valley. According to one estimate, roughly 500,000 Bengalis have left Assam following attack from radical Assamese nationalist mobs and All Assam Students Union during the 1980s.

1960s Assam language riots

In Assam's, Assamese dominated Brahmaputra Valley region Bongal Kheda movement (which literally means drive out Bengalis) was happened in the late 1948-80s, where several thousands of Hindu Bengalis was massacred by jingoists Assamese nationalists mob in various parts of Assam and as a result of this jingoist movement, nearly 5 lakh Bengali Hindus were forced to flee from Assam to take shelter in neighbouring West Bengal particularly in Jalpaiguri division in seek for safety. In the Bengali dominated Barak Valley region of Assam, violence broke out in 1960 and 1961 between Bengali Hindus and ethnic Assam police over a state bill which would have made Assamese mandatory in the secondary education curriculum. On 19 May 1961, eleven Bengali protesters were killed by Assam police fired on a demonstration at the Silchar railway station. Subsequently, the Assam government allowed Bengali as the medium of education and held it as an official position in Barak Valley.

Statehood demand

The native Bengali people of Barak Region demanded a separate state for themselves within the Bengali majority areas of Assam, particularly Bengali majority Barak valley, comprising the three districts Cachar, Hailakandi, Karimganj, to meet the criteria for creating a separate state for themselves by carving out from Assam's Assamese majority Brahmaputra valley post NRC. Silchar is the proposed capital of Barak state. Barak valley is the most neglected part of Assam in terms of its infrastructure development, tourism sector, educational institutions, hospitals, IT industries, G.D.P, H.D.I etc. which is still lagging behind in comparison to the Assam's mainland Brahmaputra valley which have access to all of those facilities mentioned above. In fact, the Southern most region of Assam that is Barak Valley have an overwhelming Bengali majority population of about (80.8%) as per 2011 census report.

Occupation
Bengali Hindus control around half of the state's business. Most of the Sweets store, jewellery businesses, books stores and cosmetic stores are owned by them. Many of the well known teachers, accountants, engineers, high level officials and government employees are from the community. A few of them are also engaged into low level works.

Notable personality 

 Priyadarshini Chatterjee, is an Indian model and beauty pageant titleholder who was crowned Femina Miss India World in 2016. She represented India at the Miss World 2016 pageant. She is the first Indian Bengali women from Dhubri district to represent India at Miss World.
 Devoleena Bhattacharjee, is an Indian actress from the Indian state of Assam, was born into a Bengali Hindu family in upper Assam.
 Jaya Bhattacharya, is an Indian television actress born and brought up in Guwahati, Assam into a Bengali Hindu family.
 Parimal Suklabaidya, is an Indian politician BJP (MLA) born into a Bengali Hindu family in Barak valley region of Assam.
 Gautam Roy, is an Indian politician born in the Indian state of Assam's Barak valley region into a Bengali Hindu Family.
 Sushmita Dev, is an Indian politician from congress party born and brought up in Assam's Barak Valley region into a Bengali Hindu family.
 Dipankar Bhattacharjee, is an Indian Badminton player from Assam, born and brought up in Assam into a Bengali Hindu family.
 Santosh Mohan Dev, was a congress political leader and key member of the party was born and brought up in Assam into a Bengali Hindu family. His family was also belonged to freedom fighter lineage.
 Debojit Saha, is an Indian playback singer born and brought up in Assam's Barak valley into a Bengali Hindu family.
 Jaya Seal, was a renowned actress and dancer, born and brought up in Assam into a Bengali Hindu family.
 Seema Biswas, is an Indian film and theatre actress from Assam, born and brought up into a Bengali Hindu family from Assam.
 Amalendu Guha, (30 January 1924 – 7 May 2015) was an historian, economist, and poet from Assam, India. He is born to a Bengali Hindu family.
 Rumi Nath, Rumi Nath is an Indian politician and was a member of Assam Legislative Assembly, was born into a Bengali Hindu family.
 Ramkrishna Ghosh, a BJP MLA from Hojai.
 Kalika Prasad Bhattacharya, singer who was born and brought up in Assam's Barak valley into a Bengali Hindu family.
 Radheshyam Biswas, former member of Lok Sabha), AIUDF, who was born and brought up in Assam's Barak valley into a Bengali Hindu family.

See also 

 Bengali Hindus
 Bongal Kheda
 D voter
 Bongal
 Bengali Hindu diaspora

References

Bengali diaspora
Hinduism in Assam
Bengali Hindus
Indian Hindus